Ruly Saputra (born April 18, 1988) is an Indonesian footballer who last played for Sriwijaya in the Indonesia Super League.

Honours

Club honors
Sriwijaya
Indonesia Super League (1): 2011–12

References

External links

1988 births
Association football midfielders
Living people
Indonesian footballers
Liga 1 (Indonesia) players
Sriwijaya F.C. players